People may face feelings of insignificance due to a number of causes, including having low self-esteem, being depressed, living in a huge, impersonal city, comparing themselves to wealthy celebrity success stories, working in a huge bureaucracy, or being in awe of a natural wonder.

Psychological factors
A person's "...sense of personal insignificance comes from two primary experiences: (a) the developmental experience with its increasing awareness of separation and loss, transience, and the sense of lost felt perfectibility; and (b) the increasing cognitive awareness of the immutable laws of biology and the limitations of the self and others in which idealization gives way to painful reality." To deal with feelings of insignificance, "...each individual seeks narcissistic reparation through the elaboration of a personal narrative or myth, a story, which gives one's life a feeling of personal significance, meaning, and purpose." These "...myths provide the individual with a personal sense of identity, and they confirm and affirm memberships in a group or community, and provide guidelines and an idealized set of behaviors..., [and] endorse an explanation for the mysterious universe."

In modern society, people living in crowded, anonymous major cities may face feelings of insignificance. George Simmel's work has addressed the issue of how the "dissociation typical of modern city life, the freeing of the person from traditional social ties as from each other" can lead to a "loss or diminution of individuality." Moreover, when a person feels like "...just another face in the crowd, an object of indifference to strangers", it can "lead to feelings of insignificance..." 

Individuals working in large, bureaucratic organizations who do not have "concrete evidence of success" may have "feelings of insignificance, disillusionment, and helplessness, which are the hallmarks of burnout. Some people in bureaucratic jobs who lack meaningful tasks, and who feel that institutional mechanisms or obstacles prevent them from receiving official recognition for their efforts, may also face boreout. 

People facing an acute depression constantly have "[g]uiltiness and insignificance feelings". People facing issues of inferiority, due to the subjective, global, and judgmental self-appraisal that they are deficient may also have feelings of insignificance.

In the book The Fear of Insignificance, psychologist Carlo Strenger "...diagnoses the wide-spread fear of the global educated class of leading insignificant lives." Strenger warns "...that the global celebrity culture is adding fuel to the 'fear of insignificance' by undermining one’s self-image and sense of self-worth." He noted that "...over recent years people around the world have been suffering from an increasing fear of their own 'insignificance'." He argues that the "impact of the global infotainment network on the individual is to blame," because it has led to the creation of "a new species...homo globalis – global man." In this new system, people "...are defined by our intimate connection to the global infotainment network, which has turned ranking and rating people on scales of wealth and celebrity into an obsession." 

Strenger states that "...as humans we naturally measure ourselves to those around us, but now that we live in a “global village” we are comparing ourselves with the most “significant” [celebrity] people in the world, and finding ourselves wanting." He notes that "...in the past being a lawyer or doctor was a very reputable profession, but in this day and age, even high achievers constantly fear that they are insignificant when they compare themselves to [celebrity] success stories in the media. Strenger claims that this "...creates highly unstable self-esteem and an unstable society."

Alain de Botton describes some of the same issues in his book Status Anxiety. Botton's book examines people's anxiety about whether they are judged a success or a failure. De Botton claims that chronic anxiety about status is an inevitable side effect of any democratic, ostensibly egalitarian society.

Edith Wharton stated that “It is less mortifying to believe one's self unpopular than insignificant, and vanity prefers to assume that indifference is a latent form of unfriendliness.”  Leo Tolstoy wrote that “If you once realize that to-morrow, if not to-day, you will die and nothing will be left of you, everything becomes insignificant!”

In philosophy

Blaise Pascal emphasized "the apparent insignificance of human existence, the "...dread of an unknown future", and the "...experience of being dominated by political and natural forces that far exceed our limited powers"; these elements "strike a chord of recognition with some of the existentialist writings that emerged in Europe following the Second World War."

Erich Fromm states that in modern capitalist societies, people develop a "...feeling of personal insignificance and powerlessness" due to "...economic recessions, global wars and terrorism." Fromm argues that in capitalist societies, the "...individual became subordinated to capitalist production and worked for profit's sake, for the development of new investment capital and for conspicuous spending." In making people "...work for extrapersonal ends," capitalism made people into a "servant to the very machine he built" and caused feelings of insignificance to arise.

In religion

Martin Luther believed that the solution to the feelings of insignificance felt by the common person "...was to accept individual insignificance, to submit, to give up individual will and strength and hope to become acceptable to God."

In relation to awe

A person who is in awe of a monumental natural wonder, such as a massive mountain peak or waterfall, may feel insignificant. Awe is an emotion comparable to wonder but less joyous, and more fearful or respectful. Awe is defined in Robert Plutchik's Wheel of emotions as a combination of surprise and fear. One dictionary definition is "an overwhelming feeling of reverence, admiration, fear, etc., produced by that which is grand, sublime, extremely powerful, or the like: in awe of God; in awe of great political figures". In general awe is directed at objects considered to be more powerful than the subject, such as the breaking of huge waves on the base of a rocky cliff, the thundering roar of a massive waterfall, the Great Pyramid of Giza, the Grand Canyon, or the vastness of open space in the cosmos (e.g., the overview effect).

In her column in Scientific American, Jennifer Ouellette referred to the vastness of the cosmos:
If one embraces an atheist worldview, it necessarily requires embracing, even celebrating, one's insignificance. It's a tall order, I know, when one is accustomed to being the center of attention. The universe existed in all its vastness before I was born, and it will exist and continue to evolve after I am gone. But knowing that doesn't make me feel bleak or hopeless. I find it strangely comforting.

In literary philosophy
The concept of "insignificance" is also important to the literary philosophy of cosmicism. One of the prominent themes in cosmicism is the utter insignificance of humanity. H. P. Lovecraft believed that "the human race will disappear. Other races will appear and disappear in turn. The sky will become icy and void, pierced by the feeble light of half-dead stars. Which will also disappear. Everything will disappear."

Colin Wilson criticizes “the sense of defeat, or disaster, or futility, that seems to underlie so much...20th century literature", and its tendency "...to portray human existence as insignificant and futile." Wilson "...calls this affliction the "fallacy of insignificance", and as he explains in The Stature of Man this fallacy is unconsciously embedded in the psychology of the modern individual." Wilson argues that the "other-directed individual...is the typical person found in our modern society today and is a victim of the "fallacy of insignificance"." He claims that the "...other directed individual has been conditioned by society to lack self-confidence in their ability to achieve anything of real worth, and thus they conform to society to escape their feelings of unimportance and uselessness."

References

See also
 The Festival of Insignificance, a novel by Milan Kundera
Emotions
Conformity
Mental states